SMS Friedrich Carl  was an ironclad warship built for the Prussian Navy in the mid-1860s. The ship was constructed in the French Societé Nouvelles des Forges et Chantiers shipyard in Toulon; her hull was laid in 1866 and launched in January 1867. The ship was commissioned into the Prussian Navy in October 1867.

Friedrich Carl served with the fleet from her commissioning in 1867 until 1895, when she was removed from front-line service to serve as a training ship. During the Franco-Prussian War in 1870–1871, the ship formed part of the main German squadron commanded by Vizeadmiral (Vice Admiral) Eduard von Jachmann. Engine trouble, however, plagued the ship and two of the other three vessels in the squadron; as a result, they made only two sorties from the port of Wilhelmshaven to challenge the French blockade. Neither resulted in combat.

Friedrich Carl was also deployed to Spain during an insurrection in 1873, during which she assisted in the seizure of three rebel vessels in two engagements. The ship was refitted at the Imperial Dockyard in Wilhelmshaven in the 1880s. She was renamed Neptun in 1902 and used as a harbor ship until June 1905, when she was removed from the naval register. The following year, she was sold to ship breakers in the Netherlands and dismantled for scrap.

Design 
The purpose of the new ships would be primarily directed against Prussia's primary naval rival, Denmark, which in the recent Second Schleswig War had imposed a blockade of German ports that Prussia had not been able to break. Ironclads were at that time a recent development and the only option for sea-going warships was the armored frigate, modeled on traditional sailing ships with a battery on the broadside.

At that time, Britain and France had the shipbuilders most experienced with the type, so the navy decided to order one vessel from each country. The contract for Friedrich Carl was placed on 9 January 1866 followed by that for  four days later, from France and Britain respectively.

General characteristics 

The ship's hull was constructed with transverse and longitudinal iron frames. It contained eight watertight compartments and had a double bottom that ran for 76 percent of the length of the vessel.

Friedrich Carl was an excellent sea boat; the ship was responsive to commands from the helm and had a moderate turning radius. Steering was controlled with a single rudder. She was somewhat unbalanced, however, and a 6 degree rudder to port was required to keep the ship on a straight course. The ship's crew numbered 33 officers and 498 enlisted men, and while serving as a flagship, the crew was augmented with a command staff of 6 officers and 35 enlisted men. Friedrich Carl carried a number of smaller boats, including a large tender, two launches, a pinnace, two cutters, two yawls, and one dinghy.

A horizontal, two-cylinder single-expansion steam engine powered the ship. It drove a four-bladed screw propeller  in diameter. Both boiler rooms were vented into a single funnel. A barque rig with a surface area of 2,010 square meters supplemented the steam engine, though in service they added little to the ship's performance.

Armament and armor 

As built, Friedrich Carl was equipped with a main battery of twenty-six rifled 72-pounder cannon. After her delivery to Germany, these guns were replaced with a pair of  L/22 guns and fourteen 21 cm L/19 guns. The two types of gun fired the same shell, of which the total supply numbered 1,656 rounds of ammunition. The fourteen L/19 guns were placed in a central battery amidships, seven on either broadside. The L/22 guns were placed on either end of the ship to serve as chase guns.

Later in her career, six  Hotchkiss revolver cannon were added to provide a defense against torpedo boats. Five  torpedo tubes were also installed at that time. Two of the tubes were placed in the bow, two on the ship's sides, and one in the stern on the port side. All were placed above the waterline, and were supplied with a total of twelve torpedoes.

Friedrich Carls armor consisted of wrought iron backed with heavy teak planking. The battery's roof was protected by  iron plating, intended to deflect shots that passed over the side of the ship or fragments from explosions.

Service history 

The Prussian Navy ordered Friedrich Carl from a French shipbuilder in 1865. She was laid down at the Societé Nouvelles des Forges et Chantiers La Seyne shipyard in Toulon the following year. The ship was launched on 16 January 1867; fitting out work was completed rapidly, and the ship was completed before the end of the year. Friedrich Carl was delivered to Prussia in October 1867 and commissioned into the fleet on the 3rd of the month. Crews for Friedrich Carl and Kronprinz were carried to the ships by the screw frigate  and the screw corvette . Both ironclads were laid up without any armament on entering service, as the new guns that had been intended to have been installed suffered serious failures during testing in 1867–1868; the Kreiner breech blocks proved to be prone to failure and so Krupp-designed guns were installed instead, with the work completed by July 1869. in June 1870, Friedrich Carl collided with the Danish schooner Auguste Robert in the Dogger Bank. The schooner was abandoned; Dutch fishermen rescued her crew.

Franco-Prussian War 

At the outbreak of the Franco-Prussian War in 1870, the greatly numerically inferior Prussian Navy assumed a defensive posture against a naval blockade imposed by the French Navy. On the 13th, however, they put into port and learned of the rising tension between France and Prussia. The ships therefore returned to Wilhelmshaven immediately, arriving on 16 July. France declared war on Prussia three days later on 19 July. Friedrich Carl,  Kronprinz, and König Wilhelm were concentrated in the North Sea at the port of Wilhelmshaven. They were subsequently joined there by the turret ship Arminius, which had been stationed in Kiel.

Despite the great French naval superiority, the French had conducted insufficient pre-war planning for an assault on the Prussian naval installations, and concluded that it would only be possible with Danish assistance, which was not forthcoming. The four ships, under the command of Vizeadmiral (Vice Admiral) Eduard von Jachmann, made an offensive sortie in early August 1870 out to the Dogger Bank, though they encountered no French warships. Friedrich Carl and the other two broadside ironclads thereafter suffered from chronic engine trouble, which left Arminius alone to conduct operations. Friedrich Carl, Kronprinz, and König Wilhelm stood off the island of Wangerooge for the majority of the conflict, while Arminius was stationed in the mouth of the Elbe river. On 11 September, the three broadside ironclads were again ready for action; they joined Arminius for another major operation into the North Sea. It too did not encounter French opposition, as the French Navy had by this time returned to France.

Through the 1870s, the German armored fleet typically saw active service during the summer months. Over the winter, most of the vessels were placed in reserve with one or two kept in a state of reduced commission as guard ships. In June 1871, the screw corvette  was in Brazil while on an overseas cruise; some of her crew had been arrested following a fistfight in the country. The Germans threatened to deploy Kronprinz, three more corvettes, and two gunboats, which convinced the Brazilian government to release the crewmen. Beginning in September 1872, Friedrich Carl embarked on a world cruise with the screw frigate  and the gunboat . They were joined by Elisabeths sister ships  and  while cruising through the Caribbean Sea.

Deployment to Spain 

In early 1873, the First Spanish Republic was beset with the Cantonal Revolution. Friedrich Carl, under the command of Vizeadmiral Reinhold Werner, steamed to Spanish waters along with a pair of unarmored vessels. The ships joined a British squadron that had been patrolling the southern Spanish coast. A rebel faction of the Spanish Navy had seized four of the country's seven ironclads. Werner, the senior commander in the group, was given command of the Anglo-German force. The squadron blockaded two rebel ironclads in the port of Cartagena after they had bombarded a coastal town. While steaming off Alicante, Friedrich Carl encountered the rebel armed steamer Vigilante, seized the vessel, and returned it to the national government.

Friedrich Carl and the British ironclad  attacked two of the rebel ships—Vitoria and Almansa—without authorization from London or Berlin. The rebel vessels had attempted to extort the port of Almería. In the brief engagement, the Anglo-German force overwhelmed the rebels and seized both ships, which were subsequently turned over to the Spanish government. The rebels considered declaring war on Germany over the affair, but eventually decided against it. A captured rebel leader was briefly held on board Friedrich Carl. Werner's blockade eventually forced the rebels to surrender, after which Friedrich Carl returned to Germany. Chancellor Otto von Bismarck ordered a court-martial for Werner, whose actions Bismarck considered to be excessive. Bismarck prohibited the Imperial Navy from conducting "gunboat diplomacy" in the future.

Later service 

In 1876, the ironclad squadron—Kronprinz, Friedrich Carl, and the new ironclads  and —were sent to the Mediterranean Sea in response to the murder of the German consul in Salonika in the Ottoman Empire. The German ships were joined by French, Russian, Italian, and Austro-Hungarian warships in an international demonstration condemning the murder. The Germans returned home in August and, after arriving in September, were laid up for the winter. The squadron went to the Mediterranean again in 1877, though this time it included Friedrich Carl, Kaiser, Deutschland, and the turret ship , along with the aviso . During the cruise, the ships visited various ports in the Aegean Sea and along the Levant. Friedrich Carl remained laid up for the 1878 training cruise that saw the loss of the brand-new ironclad  in an accidental collision with Kaiser. The ship remained in service through 1883; later that year, the training cycle concluded with a large-scale simulated attack on Kiel, with Friedrich Carl and the other ironclads acting as an "eastern" opponent. The armored fleet operated entirely under steam power that year, the first time it did so.

In 1885, Friedrich Carl had torpedo nets installed; these remained on the ship until 1897. During the 1885 refit, she also received new boilers and a modified funnel that had a second uptake installed. The battery of six 37 mm Hotchkiss guns and five torpedo tubes were also fitted during this modernization. In 1887, she was present for the ceremonies marking the beginning of construction of the Kaiser Wilhelm Canal, which was to link the Kiel with the North Sea. In 1895, the ship was disarmed; she was placed into service as a torpedo test ship on 11 August of that year. She served in this capacity until 21 January 1902, when she was renamed Neptun and used as a harbor ship. Her name was then freed to be reused on the new armored cruiser , which was launched on 22 June 1902. Neptun was formally stricken from the naval register on 22 June 1905 and sold to a Dutch ship-breaking firm in March 1906 for 284,000 gold marks. The ship was then towed to the Netherlands and broken up for scrap.

Footnotes

Notes

Citations

References 

 
 
 
 
 
 

Ships of the Prussian Navy
Ironclad warships of the Imperial German Navy
Ships built in France
1867 ships